Mladen Šarčević (born 22 January 1957) is a Serbian politician. He has served as the Minister of Education, Science and Technological Development in the Government of Serbia from 11 August 2016.

Biography 
He was born in Belgrade, where he finished elementary school and high school. After finishing primary and secondary school, he graduated from the Faculty of Mathematics - Department of Geography. He completed his postgraduate studies at the Center for Multidisciplinary Studies of the University of Belgrade - Department of Environmental Protection.

At the age of 33, he became the principal of the elementary school "Nikola Tesla" in Belgrade. He participated in the establishment of many public schools. He is the founder of several private schools, both in Serbia and in the Balkans. Šarčević is the founder of the "Ruđer Bošković" educational system.

In August 2016, he became the Minister of Education, Science and Technological Development of the Republic of Serbia. Since then, all his activities in the "Ruđer Bošković" educational system have been frozen.

Controversies 
After appearing on Radio Television of Serbia, talking about peer violence in schools, he stated that some children have a writing "beat me" on their foreheads. This provoked sharp criticism in public. Shortly afterwards, numerous LGBT rights organizations criticized him after he said that every teacher who "incites homosexuality and teaches children to be genderless beings" will be punished.

References

External links 
Званична страница основне школе Бошковић
Рампа за преписивање на матури - интервју („Политика”, 9. јун 2018)

Politicians from Belgrade
University of Belgrade Faculty of Mathematics alumni
1957 births
Living people
Government ministers of Serbia
Education ministers of Serbia